The women's competition in the super-heavyweight (+75 kg) division was staged on November 28, 2009.

Schedule

Medalists

Records

Results

New records

References
Results 

- Women's + 75 kg, 2009 World Weightlifting Championships
World